The following highways are numbered 164:

Canada
 Prince Edward Island Route 164

Costa Rica
 National Route 164

India
 State Highway 164 (Tamil Nadu)

Japan
 Japan National Route 164

United States
 Interstate 164 (former)
 U.S. Route 164 (former)
 Alabama State Route 164
 Arizona State Route 164 (former)
 Arkansas Highway 164
 Arkansas Highway 164 Spur
 California State Route 164
 Connecticut Route 164
 Florida State Road 164 (former)
 Georgia State Route 164
 Illinois Route 164
 Indiana State Road 164
 Kentucky Route 164
 Louisiana Highway 164
 Maine State Route 164
 M-164 (Michigan highway) (former)
 Missouri Route 164
 Nevada State Route 164
 New Jersey Route 164 (former)
 New York State Route 164
 Ohio State Route 164
 Oklahoma State Highway 164
 Oregon Route 164
 Pennsylvania Route 164
 South Carolina Highway 164
 Tennessee State Route 164
 Texas State Highway 164
 Texas State Highway Spur 164
 Utah State Route 164
 Virginia State Route 164
 Washington State Route 164
 Wisconsin Highway 164
Territories
 Puerto Rico Highway 164